Minye Kyawswa Saw Shwe Khet was governor of Prome (Pyay), a major vassal state of Ava, from 1417 to 1422, and from 1442 to 1446. He was the only governor or viceroy of Prome to serve more than one term. He also served as governor of districts of Prome: twice at Tharrawaddy (Thayawadi) (1422–1427) and (1446–1460) and at Paungde (1460–1470s).

Early life
Saw Shwe Khet was the eldest child of Saw Min Pu and Gov. Thinkhaya of Pagan. He was descended from the Pagan royal line from both sides. He had two younger sisters, Queen Soe Min Wimala Dewi of Hanthawaddy, Queen Atula Thiri Maha Yaza Dewi of Ava, and two younger brothers Cmdr. Uzana of Southern Cavalry and Gov. Thinkhaya of Sagu.

Career

Prome (1417–1422)
The first mention of Shwe Khet in the royal chronicles was his appointment as governor of Prome (Pyay) by his half cousin King Minkhaung I. The appointment, which came in March 1417 during the height of Forty Years' War against the Hanthawaddy Kingdom, was certainly an important one for Ava (Inwa) as Prome, along with Toungoo (Taungoo), was one of the two major states bordering Hanthawaddy. Shwe Khet, now styled as Minye Kyawswa, succeeded Thihathu, who was recalled to Ava (Inwa) to become the crown prince.

Tharrawaddy (1422–1427)
Shwe Khet's rule at Prome lasted until Thihathu came to power in 1422. Shwe Khet, who was married to Thihathu's ex-wife Princess Min Hla Htut of Ava, tried to curry favor with his new overlord by sending a white elephant, a propitious symbol of Burmese sovereigns. Thihathu accepted the gift but nonetheless demoted Shwe Khet to become a district-level governor at Tharrawaddy (Thayawadi), southernmost district of Prome.

Shwe Khet accepted his new position. At Tharrawaddy, Shwe Khet made an alliance with the new governor of Prome, Min Maha by giving his daughter Shin Yun. But his position at the frontier district became tenuous in 1425–26 when Ava went through a series of succession crises. Kings Thihathu and Min Hla were assassinated in August and November 1425, respectively. Shwe Khet's brother-in-law Gov. Kye-Taung Nyo of Kale (Kalay) seized the Ava throne but lost it six months later when Gov. Thado of Mohnyin toppled Nyo's regime at Ava. Thado himself faced a series of rebellions. Taking advantage of the situation, King Binnya Ran I of Hanthawaddy Pegu seized Tharrawaddy.

Tharrawaddy would remain under Hanthawaddy control until 1446. Ava ceded the region in 1431 in a peace treaty that also sent Shwe Khet's sister Soe Min Wimala Dewi to wed Ran in a marriage of state.

Prome (1442–1446)
The next mention of Shwe Khet in the chronicles came in 1442 when Viceroy Thihathu III of Prome became king of Ava as Narapati I. The new king, whose chief consort Atula Thiri was Shwe Khet's younger sister, appointed Shwe Khet governor of Prome, and Shwe Khet's son Minye Kyawswa governor of Kale (Kalay). Shwe Khet's term lasted until  January 1446 when the king recalled Shwe Khet to Ava. He was the only governor/ruler to serve more than once at Prome.

Tharrawaddy (1446–1460)
Shwe Khet's stay at Ava was short. He was once again appointed governor of Tharrawaddy after Narapati regained the territory  November 1446. He ruled for about another 14 years. In 1460, the king reassigned him to Paungde, and appointed his fourth son Thado Minsaw to Tharrawaddy. The king also married Thado Minsaw with Shwe Khet's daughter Myat Hpone Pyo.

Paungde (1460–1470s)
For the next dozen years, Shwe Khet stayed at Paungde. In 1472, Gov. Mingyi Swa of Prome and Gov. Thado Minsaw of Tharrawaddy decided to revolt against their eldest brother King Thihathura of Ava. Shwe Khet, an old man by then, had no choice but to support to his sons-in-law. The rebellion was brief. Thihathura laid siege to Prome in the dry season of 1472–73, and the brothers and Shwe Khet all submitted to the king in February 1473. In exchange for their submission, they were allowed to keep their offices. It was the last mention of Shwe Khet in the chronicles.

Family
Saw Shwe Khet had at least three wives, and three sons and three daughters. His notable descendants include: grandson King Bayin Htwe of Prome (r. 1526–32); great grandsons King Narapati of Prome (r. 1532–39) and King Minkhaung of Prome (r. 1539–42); two times great grandson King Minye Thihathu II of Toungoo (r. 1597–1609); three times great grandson King Natshinnaung of Toungoo (r. 1609–10). King Leik Munhtaw of Hanthawaddy (r. 1453–54) was his nephew.

Ancestry
The following is his ancestry as given in the Hmannan Yazawin chronicle, based on a contemporary inscription left by his sister Queen Atula Thiri of Ava. He was a half cousin of King Minkhaung I of Ava.

Notes

References

Bibliography
 
 
 
 
 

Ava dynasty
15th-century rulers in Asia